Igor Čerenšek (born April 22, 1983 in Zagreb) is a freestyle swimmer from Croatia, who made his Olympic debut for his native country at the 2004 Summer Olympics in Athens, Greece. There he was eliminated in the qualifying heats (13th place) of the Men's 4 × 100 m Freestyle Relay, alongside Duje Draganja, Mario Delač and Ivan Mladina. He is a 2007 graduate of the University of Minnesota.

References

External links
 Short profile on Croatian Olympic Committee 

1983 births
Living people
Croatian male freestyle swimmers
Olympic swimmers of Croatia
Swimmers at the 2004 Summer Olympics
Swimmers from Zagreb
Mediterranean Games bronze medalists for Croatia
Mediterranean Games medalists in swimming
Swimmers at the 2001 Mediterranean Games